Sentro Balita is the afternoon newscast of PTV. Originally anchored by Former Teledyaryo and News @ 6 presenter Angelique Lazo and PTV News holdover Alex Santos, it premiered on July 10, 2017, replacing PTV News. from 1:00 to 2:00 PM PST as part of programming changes brought about by the relaunch of PTV on June 28, 2017. Lazo and Aljo Bendijo, currently serves as the anchors. The newscast was simulcast on IBC-13 starting March 23, 2020 – July 31, 2020 and from September 12, 2022 until present.

History

Anchors
Angelique Lazo (since 2017)
Aljo Bendijo (2018–2020, since 2022)

Segment anchors
Trixie Jaafar-Tiu (PTV InfoWeather) (since 2020)

Fill-in anchors
Juliet Caranguian (substitute anchor for Lazo)
Diane Querrer (substitute anchor for Lazo)
Eunice Samonte (substitute anchor for Lazo)
Audrey Gorriceta (substitute anchor for Bendijo)
Trixie Jaafar-Tiu (substitute anchor for Lazo)

Former anchors
Alex Santos (2017–2018)
Audrey Gorriceta (2021–2022)
Gani Oro (2020–2021)

Former segment hosts
Ice Martinez-Pajarillo (PTV InfoWeather)
Atty. Persida Rueda-Acosta (Tapang ng Batas)
Princess Habibah Sarip-Paudac (Salam News Daily)

Segments
Current
Malasakit @ Work (Public Service) (since 2020)
PTV Traffic Center (Traffic Update) (since 2017)
Police Report (Police Report) (since 2017)
Salot na Droga (since 2018)
PTV InfoWeather (Weather Forecast) (since 2017)
Government @ Work (since 2021)
Balitang Abroad (World News) (since 2017)
Balitang ASEAN (ASEAN News) (since 2017)
PTV Sports (Sports News) (since 2017)
Sentro Showbiz (Entertainment News) (since 2020)
Trip Ko 'To (Travelogue Segment) (since 2022)
Patok sa Bayan (Feature) (since 2022)
Former
Sentro Serbisyo (Public Service) (2020–2021)
Kusina ng Masa (2020)

See also
 List of programs broadcast by People's Television Network
 Rise and Shine Pilipinas
 Ulat Bayan
 PTV Balita Ngayon
 PTV News Tonight

Philippine television news shows
People's Television Network original programming
Filipino-language television shows
2017 Philippine television series debuts
2020s Philippine television series